Makaira (Latin via Greek: μαχαίρα "sword") is a genus of marlin in the family Istiophoridae. It includes the Atlantic blue, and Indo-Pacific blue marlins. In the past, the black marlin was also included in this genus, but today it is placed in its own genus, Istiompax.

Species
  Makaira nigricans Lacepède, 1802 (Atlantic blue marlin) 
  Makaira mazara (Jordan & Snyder, 1901) (Indo-Pacific blue marlin)

Although they are traditionally listed as separate species, recent research indicates that the Atlantic blue marlin (Makaira nigricans) and Indo-Pacific blue marlin (Makaira mazara) may be parapatric populations of the same species.

References

 
Marine fish genera